Zelleria cremnospila is a moth of the family Yponomeutidae. It was described by Oswald Bertram Lower in 1900 and is found in Australia.

The wingspan is about 10 mm. The forewings are pale slaty-grey whitish, with scattered black scales and a larger black spot above the anal angle. The hindwings are greyish.

References

External links
Australian Faunal Directory

Yponomeutidae
Moths described in 1900